Siah Kamar-e Olya Maruf (also Romanized as Sīāh Kamar-e ‘Olyā Ma‘rūf; also known as Sīāh Kamar-e Ma‘rūf and Sīāh Kamar-e ‘Olyā) is a village in Mahidasht Rural District, Mahidasht District, Kermanshah County, Kermanshah Province, Iran. At the 2006 census, its population was 21, in 6 families.

References 

Populated places in Kermanshah County